Chang Hui-tsz (born 23 April 1999) is a Taiwanese freestyle wrestler. She won one of the bronze medals in the women's 76kg event at the 2019 Asian Wrestling Championships held in Xi'an, China.

Career 

At the 2017 Asian Indoor and Martial Arts Games held in Ashgabat, Turkmenistan, she competed in the 75kg event without winning a medal. She was eliminated in her first match.

She represented Chinese Taipei at the 2018 Asian Games held in Jakarta, Indonesia. She competed in the women's 76kg event without winning a medal. She was eliminated in her first match by Hwang Eun-ju of South Korea. In the same year, she also competed in the women's 76kg event at the 2018 World Wrestling Championships held in Budapest, Hungary. In this competition she was eliminated in her first match by Kiran Bishnoi of India.

In 2019, she won the gold medal in the 76kg event at the Asian U23 Wrestling Championship held in Ulaanbaatar, Mongolia. In the same year, she also competed in the women's 76kg event at the 2019 World Wrestling Championships in Nur-Sultan, Kazakhstan without winning a medal.

She competed in the women's 76kg event at the 2022 U23 World Wrestling Championships held in Pontevedra, Spain.

Achievements

References

External links 
 

Living people
1999 births
Place of birth missing (living people)
Taiwanese female sport wrestlers
Wrestlers at the 2018 Asian Games
Asian Games competitors for Chinese Taipei
21st-century Taiwanese women